"Stories" is a song by rock band Therapy? and a single released on 22 May 1995 on A&M Records. The song is featured on the Infernal Love album. The single reached number 14 in the UK Singles Chart, and number 15 in the Irish Singles Chart.

The single was released on CD, orange 7" vinyl, and cassette.

Track listing

Personnel
 Andy Cairns: vocals/guitar
 Fyfe Ewing: drums
 Michael McKeegan: bass
 Martin McCarrick: cello
 Simon Clarke: saxophone
 Al Clay: producer, engineer, mixer
 Mark Pistel: additional mixing (Isolation)
 Philip Steir: additional mixing (Isolation)

References

1995 singles
Therapy? songs
A&M Records singles
1995 songs
Songs written by Andy Cairns
Songs written by Michael McKeegan